The Short SC.7 Skyvan (nicknamed the "Flying Shoebox") is a British 19-seat twin-turboprop aircraft manufactured by Short Brothers of Belfast, Northern Ireland. It is used mainly for short-haul freight and skydiving.

The Short 330 and Short 360 are stretched models of the original SC.7, designed as regional airliners.

Design and development
In 1958, Short was approached by F.G. Miles Ltd (successor company to Miles Aircraft) which was seeking backing to produce a development of the H.D.M.106 Caravan design with a high aspect ratio wing similar to that of the Hurel-Dubois HD.31.  Short acquired the design and data gathered from trials of the Miles Aerovan based H.D.M.105 prototype.  After evaluating the Miles proposal, Short rejected the Caravan. They developed their own design for a utility all-metal aircraft which was called the Short SC.7 Skyvan. The Skyvan is a twin-engined all-metal, high-wing monoplane, with a braced, high aspect ratio wing, and an unpressurised, square-section fuselage with twin fins and rudders.  It was popular with freight operators compared to other small aircraft because of its large rear door for loading and unloading freight. Its fuselage resembles the shape of a railroad boxcar for simplicity and efficiency.

Construction started at Sydenham Airport in 1960, and the first prototype first flew on 17 January 1963, powered by two Continental piston engines. In 1967, it was found that the Astazou XII was temperature limited at high altitudes. A total of 149 Skyvans (including the two prototypes) were produced before production ended in 1986. The United States Air Force operated Sherpa Skyvans in Europe for spare parts and cargo delivery. The larger Sherpas were developed from the earlier models.

Operational history
Skyvans served widely in both military and civilian operations, and the type remained in service in 2009 with a number of civilian operators, and in military service in Guyana and Oman.  

Skyvans were used during the infamous death flights at the depths of Argentina's Dirty War in 1977, during which around 4,400 detainees were thrown to their deaths onto the Río de la Plata.

Two Argentine Naval Prefecture Skyvans later participated in the 1982 Falklands War. Both aircraft were ferried to Port Stanley in April 1982. One aircraft was damaged by British naval gunfire on Stanley racecourse, and did not fly again; it was finally destroyed by shellfire during British bombardments on 12/13 June 1982. The second aircraft was used at Pebble Island, where it became bogged down in the soft ground, and on 15 May 1982 it was destroyed by a British raiding party.

Skyvans continue to be used in limited numbers for air-to-air photography and for skydiving operations. In 1970, Questor Surveys of Toronto Canada converted the first of two Skyvan 3s for aerial geological survey work. The Collier Mosquito Control District uses Skyvans for aerial spraying.

Variants
Skyvan 1 prototype, one built. 2 x Continental GTSIO-520 engines.
Skyvan 1A re-engined 1st prototype.  2 x 388 kW (520 hp) Turbomeca Astazou II engines.
Skyvan 2 Turbomeca Astazou powered production.  8 Series 2 produced (including the second prototype).
 Garrett TPE331 powered production. 140 produced (of all Series 3 versions) plus 2 Series 2 were converted. 
Skyvan 3A higher gross weight version of Skyvan Series 3.

Skyvan 3M military transport version. It can be used for supply dropping, assault transport, dropping paratroops, troop transport, cargo transport, casualty evacuation, plus search and rescue missions.
Skyvan 3M-200 high gross weight version of Skyvan 3M (MTOW 6,804 kg, 15,000 lb).
Skyliner deluxe all-passenger version.
Seavan Maritime patrol version, (SC7-3M-4022), principally used by the Sultan of Oman's Air Force / Royal Air Force of Oman (SOAF / RAFO)

Operators

Civilian operators
As of July 2009, a total of 39 Skyvan aircraft remained in airline or skydiving service, with Pink Aviation Services (4), Sonair (1), Swala Aviation (2), Transway Air Services (1), Deraya Air Taxi (3), Layang Layang Aerospace (1), Macair Airlines (1), Malaysia Air Charter (1), Olympic Airways (1), Pan Malaysian Air Transport (1), Wirakris Udara (1), CAE Aviation (1), Deltacraft (1), Invicta Aviation (2),  Advanced Air (1), Allwest Freight (2), Era Alaska (3), GB Airlink (1), North Star Air Cargo (5), Skylift Taxi Aereo (1), Skydive Arizona (13), Skydive DeLand (1), Skydive Perris (5), Sydney Skydivers (2), SkyForce Piotrków Trybunalski (1), Skydive Pennsylvania and Summit Air (2), Eagle Air (2), Sustut Air (1), Ryan Air Services, Nomad Air (2), Aalto University (Helsinki, Finland), Skykef (Israel)

As of January 2019 Era Alaska, Ryan Air Services and All West Freight no longer operate Skyvans.

Sydney skydivers no longer own Skyvans.

As of May 2019, Olympic Air (successor to Olympic Airways) no longer operates Skyvans.

In 2019, Invicta Aviation sold their 2 Skyvans (G-PIGY, G-BEOL) to the Guyana Defence Force.

Military operators
 
 Guyana Defence Force
 
 Royal Air Force of Oman: Oman continues to operate five of its original 16 Skyvans as of December 2013.

Former military operators

Argentine Coast Guard: Bought five in 1971, survivors sold in 1995 following replacement by five CASA C-212 Aviocars.

Austrian Air Force

Botswana Defence Force Air Wing

Ciskei Defence Force

Ecuadorian Army 

Military of Gambia

Ghana Air Force

Indonesian Air Force

Japan Coast Guard

Lesotho Defence Force – Air Squadron

Malawi Police Force Air Wing 

Mauritania Islamic Air Force: bought two Skyvan 3Ms in 1975

Mexican Air Force

Nepalese Army
Nepalese Army Air Service

Yemen Arab Republic Air Force: operated two Skyvans as of 1984

Panamanian Public Forces 

Republic of Singapore Air Force
121 Squadron, Republic of Singapore Air Force operated the Skyvan 3M for Utility transport and Search-and-locate duties from 1973 to 1993.

Royal Thai Police
Thai Border Patrol Police

United Arab Emirates Air Force

Yemen Air Force

Specification (Skyvan 3)

See also

References

Citations

Bibliography

External links 
 

1960s British cargo aircraft
1960s British airliners
Aircraft first flown in 1963
High-wing aircraft
Short Brothers aircraft
Twin-turboprop tractor aircraft
Twin-tail aircraft